(–)-2β-Carbomethoxy-3β-(4-bromophenyl)tropane (RTI-4229-51, bromopane) is a semi-synthetic alkaloid in the phenyltropane group of psychostimulant compounds. First publicized in the 1990s, it has not been used enough to have gained a fully established profile. RTI-51 can be expected to have properties lying somewhere in between RTI-31 and RTI-55. Importantly it has a ratio of monoamine reuptake inhibition of D > S > N (1.8:10.6:37.4nM respectively) which is an unusual balance of effects not produced by other commonly used compounds (although RTI-121 is similar, but more DAT selective). It has been used in its 76Br radiolabelled form to map the distribution of dopamine transporters in the brain.

Modern research seems to confirm the above hypothesis. However, earlier work produced more scattered results. Based upon what is obvious from the table, RTI-31, RTI-51, and RTI-55 are all similarly potent TRIs.

Data in Above table from rats brains (1995). More recent work has advocated using cloned human transporter/s.

See also 
 List of cocaine analogues

References 

Organobromides
Tropanes
RTI compounds
Dopamine reuptake inhibitors
Sympathomimetic amines
Medical imaging
Neuroimaging